Chandresh Kumari Katoch (born 1 February 1944) is an Indian politician belonging to the Indian National Congress party. She is a former Minister of Culture in India's central government. She was a Member of Parliament in the Lok Sabha (the lower house of parliament), representing Jodhpur constituency. Katoch was sworn in as Cabinet Minister in the Government of India on 28 October 2012, and was given the portfolio of the Ministry of Culture. She is daughter of Maharaja Hanwant Singh of Jodhpur  and Maharani Krishna Kumari and is married into the royal family of Kangra  with Raja Aditya Dev Chand Katoch, in Himachal Pradesh. She contested but lost in the 2014 Indian general election.

Positions held
1972–77	Member, Himachal Pradesh Legislative Assembly( from Dharamshala constituency)
1977	Deputy Minister, Government of Himachal Pradesh
1982–84	Member, Himachal Pradesh Legislative Assembly (second term from Dharamshala constituency)
1984 (for 9 Months)	Minister of State, Tourism, Govt. of Himachal Pradesh
1984	Elected to 8th Lok Sabha from Kangra (Lok Sabha constituency)
1996	Elected to Rajya Sabha
1998–1999	Deputy Chief Whip, Congress Party in Rajya Sabha
1999-03	President, All India Mahila Congress
2003–07	Member, Himachal Pradesh Legislative Assembly (third term from Dharamshala constituency)
2003–2004	Cabinet Minister, Govt. of Himachal Pradesh
2009	Re-elected to 15th Lok Sabha from Jodhpur (2nd term)
2012 Cabinet Minister, Ministry of Cultural, Government of India.

References

People from Jodhpur
India MPs 2009–2014
Living people
1944 births
India MPs 1984–1989
Rajya Sabha members from Himachal Pradesh
Indian National Congress politicians
Women in Rajasthan politics
Members of the Cabinet of India
Lok Sabha members from Rajasthan
Lok Sabha members from Himachal Pradesh
Women in Himachal Pradesh politics
20th-century Indian women politicians
20th-century Indian politicians
21st-century Indian women politicians
21st-century Indian politicians
Women state cabinet ministers of India
Women members of the Cabinet of India
Culture Ministers of India
Rajput princesses
Indian princesses
Women members of the Lok Sabha
Women members of the Rajya Sabha
Himachal Pradesh MLAs 1972–1977
Himachal Pradesh MLAs 1982–1985